The Members of 12th Legislative Assembly of Maharashtra were elected during the 2009 Maharashtra Legislative Assembly election, with results announced on 22nd October 2009.

The ruling INC-NCP(Democratic Front) won the elections gaining 82 and 62 Seats respectively and winning 175 seats in alliance with support of independents and smaller parties. The opposition Shiv Sena-Bharatiya Janata Party lost the election gaining 45 and 46 seats respectively and winning 91 seats in alliance. Incumbent CM Ashok Chavan was again sworn in as the Chief minister of Maharashtra with Ajit Pawar of NCP as his Deputy.

Due to scam allegations on Ashok Chavan, The Congress replaced him with senior Congress leader Prithviraj Chavan as the Chief minister of Maharashtra.

Members 
 Speaker:
Dilip Walse-Patil,  NCP 

 Deputy Speaker: 
Madhukarrao Chavan, INC
(10 December 2009- 18 November 2010)
Vasant Chinduji Purke, INC
(04 December 2010 - 08 November 2014)
 Chief minister:Ashok Chavan, INC
(07 November 2009	- 09 November 2010)
Prithviraj Chavan, INC
(11 November 2010 - 26 September 2014)

 Deputy Chief Minister: 
Chhagan Bhujbal, NCP
(07 November 2009	- 09 November 2010)

Ajit Pawar, NCP

(11 November 2010 - 26 September 2014)

 Leaders of The House: 
Ashok Chavan, INC
(07 November 2009	- 09 November 2010)
Prithviraj Chavan, INC
(11 November 2010 - 26 September 2014)

 Leader of Opposition:''' 
Eknath Khadse,  BJP

Party-wise seats

Members of Legislative Assembly

References 

Maharashtra Legislature